The Peelennium was a selection of songs by BBC Radio DJ John Peel from 1900 to 2000 in order to celebrate the last 100 years of music leading up to the millennium. It was carefully timed to play out over the 100 remaining shows of 1999, starting with Thursday 13 May.


History
For the Peelennium John Peel and his producers selected at least four tracks from each year of the last century. Thus stretching from 1900 to the millennium, it was broadcast during the last hundred shows of John Peel's BBC Radio 1 show in 1999.

Peel's musical history knowledge and record collection were used, along with research to find the most interesting tracks from a particular year. BBC Archive and Information and BBC Music Library were involved extensively in finding the necessary tracks and making sure that they actually were original recordings.

The idea of the Peelennium was conceived as a musical way to celebrate the millennium, but also to illustrate how popular musical styles had changed over the century, and shaped the music we listen to today.

The Peelennium began on Thursday 13 May 1999 with the year 1900.

List of presented records

References 

Lists of songs
BBC Radio 1
John Peel